The Raiziss and de Palchi Translation Awards was established in 1995 through a bequest to the New York Community Trust by Sonia Raiziss Giop, a poet, translator, and editor of Chelsea.

The awards recognize translations into English of modern Italian poetry through a $10,000 book prize or a $25,000 fellowship with residency at the American Academy in Rome.

Awards

References

American literary awards
American poetry awards
Translation award winners
Awards established in 1995
Translation-related lists
American literature-related lists